Anti-antisemitism is opposition to antisemitism or prejudice against Jews, and just like the history of antisemitism, the history of anti-antisemitism is long and multifaceted. According to historian Omer Bartov, political controversies around antisemitism involve "those who see the world through an antisemitic prism, for whom everything that has gone wrong with the world, or with their personal lives, is the fault of the Jews; and those who see the world through an anti-antisemitic prism, for whom every critical observation of Jews as individuals or as a community, or, most crucially, of the state of Israel, is inherently antisemitic".  It is disputed whether or not anti-antisemitism is synonymous with philosemitism, but anti-antisemitism often includes the "imaginary and symbolic idealization of ‘the Jew’" which is similar to philosemitism.

Strategies
A key Zionist belief is that antisemitism cannot be addressed in any way other than the establishment of an independent state where Jews make up the majority of the population.

Yair Wallach argues that non-Bolshevik Jewish activists played an essential role in the successes of early Soviet anti-antisemitism, and he also argues that this fact proves that Jewish activists are essential to effectively combating antisemitism in 2021.

In the US, a plethora of novels which opposed antisemitism was published in the 1940s, a subgenre of social protest literature.

Anti-antisemitism and antiracism
Opposition to antisemitism in the United Kingdom is historically connected to anti-racism, but in the 1990s, it began to diverge. Anthony Lester, the drafter of the Race Relations Act 1976, cited his experience of antisemitism to write a bill combating all forms of racial prejudice. According to  Gidley et al, this divergence came about in part due to disagreement over Zionism and anti-Zionism. The idea of white privilege, structural racism, and perceptions that racism is based on skin color and colonialism made it harder to identify antisemitism.

Islamophobia is similar to antisemitism because both prejudices are ethnoreligious prejudices. In the twenty-first century, several populist radical right parties in Western Europe began to use anti-antisemitic and pro-Israel rhetoric as a means to oppose Muslim immigration and promote the belief that a clash of civilizations is occurring between Judeo-Christian Europe and the Muslim world. This belief is expressed along with the belief that Jews who live outside Israel are not part of the nations in which they live because they are only tolerated guests. In Hungary, right-wing parties such as Fidesz and later Jobbik distanced themselves from antisemitism and expressed pro-Israel beliefs, although Fidesz also promotes George Soros conspiracy theories. According to anthropologist Ivan Kalmar, "Anti-antisemitism allows populists to promote Islamophobia openly without the fear of being labelled Nazis."

Anti-antisemitism is "a defining marker of post-war German identity". The belief that Germany has successfully confronted The Holocaust enables the projection of antisemitism onto the outside world, especially to Muslim immigrants—a subtle form of Islamophobia that coexists with the vehement rejection of antisemitism. Hannah C. Tzuberi argues that in Germany, anti-antisemitism can go beyond the identification of Germans with Jews because it can even include the identification of Germans as Jews and the identification of Germany as Israel.

Anti-antisemitic watchdogs
According to Jonathan Judaken, anti-antisemitic watchdogs "may inadvertently help stoke new cases by giving activists a megaphone". He suggested that watchdog groups raise money by portraying antisemitism as a serious threat. In the United States, all watchdogs are pro-Israel.

Public opinion
According to public opinion surveys, the amount of anti-antisemitism in Poland (defined as "the rejection of any statements criticizing Jews") increased between 2002 and 2012.

References

Further reading

Antisemitism
Anti-racism